D